Sunbreaker Cove is a summer village in Alberta, Canada. It is located on the northern shore of Sylvan Lake.

Demographics 

In the 2016 Census of Population conducted by Statistics Canada, the Summer Village of Sunbreaker Cove had a population of 81 living in 41 of its 240 total private dwellings, a  change from its 2011 population of 69.

See also 
List of communities in Alberta
List of summer villages in Alberta
List of resort villages in Saskatchewan

References

External links 

1990 establishments in Alberta
Summer villages in Alberta